Bucșa (older font Bucşa) or Bucsa may refer to several villages:

Romania
 Bucşa, in Răchitoasa Commune, Bacău County
 Bucşa, in Valea Ciorii Commune, Ialomiţa County

Hungary
 Bucsa, Hungary, in Békés County, Southern Great Plain region

See also
 Bucşă - family name from iron bolt on a cartwheel, frequently spelled Bucşa
 Bucșani (disambiguation)